A tønne (plural tønner) is an old Norwegian unit of volume equivalent to a barrel. There was a dry tønne and a liquid tønne. The volume of a tønne has varied over time in Norway, including many local variations.

A dry tønne was divided into four fjerdinger, equivalent to  each.

This corresponded to the amount of land that could be sown with one tønne of seed.

References

External links
 Norsk historisk leksikon: Kornmål. (lokalhistorikwiki.no).

Units of volume
Obsolete units of measurement